Luiz Augusto Vinhaes (10 December 1896 – 3 April 1960) was a Brazilian football player and manager. At the 1934 FIFA World Cup he was the Brazil national team coach. As a player he was associated with São Cristóvão AC of the late 1910s and early 1920s.

Honours  
São Cristóvão
 Campeonato Carioca: 1926

Bangu
 Campeonato Carioca: 1933

References 

Footballers from Rio de Janeiro (city)
1896 births
1960 deaths
Brazilian football managers
1934 FIFA World Cup managers
São Cristóvão de Futebol e Regatas managers
Fluminense FC managers
Brazil national football team managers
Bangu Atlético Clube managers
Brazil national under-20 football team managers
Association footballers not categorized by position
Association football players not categorized by nationality